"Be Easy" is a song by Lebanese Canadian R&B singer Massari. It was released in April 2005 from his self-titled debut album Massari.

Music video
A music video was made for the song, which won "Best Pop Video" at the 2006 MuchMusic Video Awards. It features Massari with a yellow Lamborghini with some ladies dancing.

Charts

References

2005 singles
2005 songs
Massari songs
CP Music Group singles
Songs written by Massari